Quelimane is a seaport in Mozambique. It is the administrative capital of the Zambezia Province and the province's largest city, and stands  from the mouth of the Rio dos Bons Sinais (or "River of the Good Signs").  The river was named when Vasco da Gama, on his way to India, reached it and saw "good signs" that he was on the right path. The town was the end point of David Livingstone's west-to-east crossing of south-central Africa in 1856. Portuguese is the official language of Mozambique, and many residents of the areas surrounding Quelimane speak Portuguese. The most common local language is Chuabo. Quelimane, along with much of Zambezia Province, is extremely prone to floods during Mozambique's rainy season. The most recent bout of severe flooding took place in January 2007.

History

Pre-colonial era
The town originated as a Swahili trade centre, and then grew as a slave market. Quelimane was founded by Muslim traders (see Kilwa Sultanate) and was one of the oldest towns in the region.

Etymology 

The origins of the name 'Quelimane' are obscure. One tradition alleges that Vasco da Gama, in 1498, inquired about the name of the place from some inhabitants laboring in the fields outside the settlement.  Thinking he was asking what they were doing, they simply replied kuliamani ('we are cultivating').

An alternative explanation is that when the Portuguese reached the settlement, they were welcomed by a notable Arab, or half Arab, who acted as interpreter between them and the natives. The name which the Portuguese applied to this individual, and his settlement, was 'Quelimane' (pronounced Kelimãn), because in the corrupt Arabic spoken on the East African coast 'Kalimãn' is the word for 'Interpreter'. In Swahili it is 'Mkalimani'.

In 1761, the city became a town. Until 1853 trade was forbidden to any other than Portuguese. Sisal plantations were organized by Swiss planters in the beginning of the 20th century, namely Joseph Émile Stucky de Quay. The town started to grow and attracted several communities from different backgrounds, including Muslims and Indians, and new infrastructure was built by the Portuguese authorities. Its busy port had tea, grown and processed in the district of Zambézia (particularly important in the region around Gurúè, former Vila Junqueiro), as its major export. Coconut was also produced and transformed in the city. By 1970, Quelimane had 71,786 inhabitants.

Independence

Mozambique became independent from Portugal in 1975, after the April 1974 Carnation Revolution at Lisbon. Although its location on the Rio dos Bons Sinais is less important today than in the past, Quelimane remains a major town with a large hospital, two cathedrals, a mosque, and a public university for teachers. Due to its heat, humidity, and distance from the beach, Quelimane is not among Mozambique's major tourist destinations.  However, its status as a provincial capital and the fourth-largest city in Mozambique and the increasing ease of access by plane (Linhas Aéreas de Moçambique runs flights) and road contribute to a small but relatively steady stream of visitors. In addition, Quelimane is home to branches of many international NGOs, and frequent visits from foreign aid consultants, workers, and government officials also contribute to the economy. The city received a further boost when Quelimane hosted the Ninth Annual Frelimo Party Convention in November 2006. After decades of municipal decline, the current mayor, Manuel de Araujo, is reportedly overseeing a renewed civic effort at economic and infrastructural restoration.

Places of worship    
Among the places of worship, they are predominantly Christian churches and temples: Roman Catholic Diocese of Quelimane (Catholic Church), (Reformed Church in Mozambique (World Communion of Reformed Churches), Igreja Presbiteriana de Moçambique (World Communion of Reformed Churches), Convenção Baptista de Moçambique (Baptist World Alliance), Universal Church of the Kingdom of God, Assemblies of God, Zion Christian Church. There are also Muslim mosques.

Demographics

Climate 
Quelimane has a tropical savanna climate (Köppen climate classification Aw).

See also 
 Railway stations in Mozambique
 Quelimane Airport

International relations

Twin towns — Sister cities
Quelimane is twinned with:
  Le Port, Réunion

References

External links

quelimane.no.sapo.pt 

 
Populated places in Zambezia Province
Provincial capitals in Mozambique
Swahili city-states